The Tonga national basketball team is the team that represents Tonga in international basketball and is a member of FIBA Oceania.

Competitions

Performance at FIBA Oceania Championship
yet to qualify

Performance at Oceania Basketball Tournament
1989 : ?
1993 : 
1997 : ?
2001 : ?
2005 : ?
2009 : ?
2013 :

Performance at Pacific Games
2019 : 7th

See also
 Tonga at the Olympics

References
2007 Tonga National Basketball Team information

Men's national basketball teams
Basketball
1987 establishments in Tonga